Ukrainian Sheriffs is a 2015 Ukrainian documentary film directed by . It was selected as the Ukrainian entry for the Best Foreign Language Film at the 89th Academy Awards but it was not nominated.

Synopsis
Kryvoborodko and Rudkovsky's work combines the functions of police officers and social workers, as they are tasked with mediating disputes, but not with investigating criminal offenses. The beginning of the Russo-Ukrainian War (2014- ) changes their routine, however - village politics become divided, and the sheriffs are tasked with supporting the Ukrainian war-effort.

Production
Ukrainian Sheriffs was filmed over four years, for a total of nearly 200 hours of footage. The first cut of the film was five hours in length and remained over two hours in length until its sixth cut.

Distribution
Ukrainian Sheriffs began distribution throughout Europe in February 2016. The film's premiere on German television took place on 4 April 2016 on the Franco-German channel Arte. Distribution of the film in Ukraine began in July 2016 and then in the Baltics and Balkans in September.

Reception
Ukrainian film critic , writing for The Day, praised Ukrainian Sheriffs and described Marunyak, Kryvoborodko, and Rudkovsky as role models for Ukraine, and compared the latter two to American police officers. Neil Young, in The Hollywood Reporter, described Ukrainian Sheriffs as "an episodic, wryly amusing affair, displaying considerable interest in and sympathy with human foibles." Fionnuala Halligan, chief film critic at Screen Daily, also praised the film and predicted that it would do well at international film festivals.

Accolades
It then added Ukrainian Sheriffs to a shortlist of submissions for the Best Foreign Language Film category of the 89th Academy Awards with The Nest of the Turtledove and Song of Songs. Ukrainian Sheriffs was eventually chosen as Ukraine's submission for the category.

The film won the International Documentary Film Festival Amsterdam's 2015 Special Jury Award. It also won the Grand Prix at the Docs Against Gravity Festival in Poland, and appeared at a dozen other international film festivals.

See also
 List of submissions to the 89th Academy Awards for Best Foreign Language Film
 List of Ukrainian submissions for the Academy Award for Best Foreign Language Film

References

External links
 

2015 films
2015 documentary films
Ukrainian documentary films
Ukrainian-language films
Russian-language Ukrainian films
Documentary films about law enforcement
Documentary films about politics
War in Donbas films
Documentary films about Ukraine